The Braille pattern dots-2346 is a 6-dot braille cell with the top right, middle left, and both bottom dots raised, or an 8-dot braille cell with the top right, upper-middle left, and both lower-middle dots raised. It is represented by the Unicode code point U+282e, and in Braille ASCII with an exclamation mark: !.

Unified Braille

In unified international braille, the braille pattern dots-2346 is used to represent a voiced alveolar fricative or aspirate, such as /ð/ or /dʱ/, and is otherwise assigned as needed.

Table of unified braille values

Other braille

Plus dots 7 and 8

Related to Braille pattern dots-2346 are Braille patterns 23467, 23468, and 234678, which are used in 8-dot braille systems, such as Gardner-Salinas and Luxembourgish Braille.

Related 8-dot kantenji patterns

In the Japanese kantenji braille, the standard 8-dot Braille patterns 3578, 13578, 34578, and 134578 are the patterns related to Braille pattern dots-2346, since the two additional dots of kantenji patterns 02346, 23467, and 023467 are placed above the base 6-dot cell, instead of below, as in standard 8-dot braille.

Kantenji using braille patterns 3578, 13578, 34578, or 134578

This listing includes kantenji using Braille pattern dots-2346 for all 6349 kanji found in JIS C 6226-1978.

  - 方

Variants and thematic compounds

  -  selector 3 + ほ/方  =  敖
  -  selector 4 + ほ/方  =  旁
  -  selector 5 + ほ/方  =  亡
  -  selector 6 + ほ/方  =  甫
  -  ほ/方 + selector 1  =  夕
  -  ほ/方 + selector 2  =  死
  -  ほ/方 + selector 2 + selector 2  =  歹
  -  ほ/方 + そ/馬  =  少

Compounds of 方

  -  つ/土 + ほ/方  =  坊
  -  ふ/女 + ほ/方  =  妨
  -  と/戸 + ほ/方  =  房
  -  い/糹/#2 + ほ/方  =  紡
  -  ⺼ + ほ/方  =  肪
  -  く/艹 + ほ/方  =  芳
  -  く/艹 + ほ/方 + や/疒  =  蔟
  -  か/金 + く/艹 + ほ/方  =  錺
  -  せ/食 + く/艹 + ほ/方  =  餝
  -  え/訁 + ほ/方  =  訪
  -  さ/阝 + ほ/方  =  防
  -  ほ/方 + 氷/氵  =  放
  -  仁/亻 + ほ/方  =  倣
  -  ほ/方 + 龸  =  於
  -  れ/口 + ほ/方 + 龸  =  唹
  -  に/氵 + ほ/方 + 龸  =  淤
  -  も/門 + ほ/方 + 龸  =  閼
  -  せ/食 + ほ/方 + 龸  =  鯲
  -  ほ/方 + ち/竹  =  施
  -  心 + ほ/方 + ち/竹  =  葹
  -  ほ/方 + ゆ/彳  =  旅
  -  ⺼ + ほ/方 + ゆ/彳  =  膂
  -  ほ/方 + し/巿  =  旆
  -  ほ/方 + よ/广  =  旋
  -  ほ/方 + や/疒  =  族
  -  れ/口 + ほ/方 + や/疒  =  嗾
  -  ち/竹 + ほ/方 + や/疒  =  簇
  -  か/金 + ほ/方 + や/疒  =  鏃
  -  ほ/方 + き/木  =  旗
  -  ち/竹 + ほ/方 + き/木  =  籏
  -  囗 + 龸 + ほ/方  =  圀
  -  ゆ/彳 + 宿 + ほ/方  =  彷
  -  ほ/方 + ふ/女 + selector 4  =  旃
  -  ほ/方 + selector 4 + せ/食  =  旄
  -  ほ/方 + せ/食 + い/糹/#2  =  旌
  -  ほ/方 + 宿 + く/艹  =  旒
  -  ほ/方 + 宿 + の/禾  =  旙
  -  ほ/方 + の/禾 + た/⽥  =  旛
  -  心 + 宿 + ほ/方  =  枋
  -  ふ/女 + 宿 + ほ/方  =  舫
  -  と/戸 + 宿 + ほ/方  =  髣
  -  せ/食 + 宿 + ほ/方  =  魴

Compounds of 敖

  -  火 + selector 3 + ほ/方  =  熬
  -  む/車 + selector 3 + ほ/方  =  螯
  -  ひ/辶 + selector 3 + ほ/方  =  遨
  -  せ/食 + selector 3 + ほ/方  =  鰲
  -  な/亻 + 宿 + ほ/方  =  傲
  -  れ/口 + 宿 + ほ/方  =  嗷
  -  ほ/方 + 比 + め/目  =  鼇

Compounds of 旁

  -  な/亻 + ほ/方  =  傍
  -  ゑ/訁 + ほ/方  =  謗
  -  心 + selector 4 + ほ/方  =  蒡
  -  き/木 + 宿 + ほ/方  =  榜
  -  に/氵 + 宿 + ほ/方  =  滂
  -  ま/石 + 宿 + ほ/方  =  磅
  -  ⺼ + 宿 + ほ/方  =  膀

Compounds of 亡

  -  る/忄 + ほ/方  =  忙
  -  め/目 + ほ/方  =  盲
  -  ほ/方 + 心  =  忘
  -  ほ/方 + ら/月  =  望
  -  ほ/方 + ふ/女  =  妄
  -  仁/亻 + ほ/方 + ふ/女  =  侫
  -  る/忄 + selector 5 + ほ/方  =  惘
  -  に/氵 + selector 5 + ほ/方  =  瀛
  -  ⺼ + selector 5 + ほ/方  =  肓
  -  心 + selector 5 + ほ/方  =  芒
  -  か/金 + selector 5 + ほ/方  =  鋩
  -  く/艹 + selector 5 + ほ/方  =  茫
  -  む/車 + selector 5 + ほ/方  =  虻
  -  ほ/方 + み/耳 + ん/止  =  氓

Compounds of 甫

  -  も/門 + ほ/方  =  匍
  -  れ/口 + ほ/方  =  哺
  -  て/扌 + ほ/方  =  捕
  -  に/氵 + ほ/方  =  浦
  -  心 + に/氵 + ほ/方  =  蒲
  -  り/分 + ほ/方  =  舗
  -  り/分 + り/分 + ほ/方  =  舖
  -  ね/示 + ほ/方  =  補
  -  ⺼ + selector 6 + ほ/方  =  脯
  -  ひ/辶 + selector 6 + ほ/方  =  逋
  -  せ/食 + selector 6 + ほ/方  =  鯆
  -  囗 + 宿 + ほ/方  =  圃
  -  つ/土 + 宿 + ほ/方  =  埔
  -  心 + 龸 + ほ/方  =  葡
  -  む/車 + 宿 + ほ/方  =  輔
  -  か/金 + 宿 + ほ/方  =  鋪
  -  せ/食 + 龸 + ほ/方  =  餔
  -  し/巿 + 宿 + ほ/方  =  黼

Compounds of 夕

  -  ほ/方 + ほ/方  =  多
  -  た/⽥ + ほ/方  =  夥
  -  selector 1 + ほ/方 + ほ/方  =  夛
  -  な/亻 + ほ/方 + ほ/方  =  侈
  -  龸 + ほ/方  =  夢
  -  な/亻 + 龸 + ほ/方  =  儚
  -  火 + ほ/方  =  炙
  -  の/禾 + ほ/方  =  移
  -  ほ/方 + れ/口  =  名
  -  心 + ほ/方 + れ/口  =  茗
  -  せ/食 + ほ/方 + れ/口  =  酩
  -  ほ/方 + と/戸  =  外
  -  ひ/辶 + ほ/方 + と/戸  =  迯
  -  む/車 + ほ/方  =  舞
  -  さ/阝 + ほ/方 + selector 1  =  夘
  -  に/氵 + ほ/方 + selector 1  =  汐
  -  ほ/方 + き/木 + き/木  =  梦
  -  ほ/方 + selector 5 + い/糹/#2  =  舛

Compounds of 死 and 歹

  -  宿 + ほ/方  =  夙
  -  ほ/方 + ぬ/力  =  列
  -  ほ/方 + 火  =  烈
  -  ほ/方 + ね/示  =  裂
  -  氷/氵 + ほ/方 + ぬ/力  =  冽
  -  に/氵 + ほ/方 + ぬ/力  =  洌
  -  ほ/方 + な/亻  =  殆
  -  ほ/方 + か/金  =  殊
  -  ほ/方 + 囗  =  残
  -  ほ/方 + ほ/方 + 囗  =  殘
  -  ほ/方 + め/目  =  殖
  -  ほ/方 + み/耳  =  殱
  -  ほ/方 + ほ/方 + み/耳  =  殲
  -  ほ/方 + す/発  =  殉
  -  氷/氵 + ほ/方 + selector 2  =  斃
  -  く/艹 + ほ/方 + selector 2  =  薨
  -  ほ/方 + に/氵 + の/禾  =  歿
  -  ほ/方 + 宿 + け/犬  =  殀
  -  ほ/方 + け/犬 + お/頁  =  殃
  -  ほ/方 + 宿 + う/宀/#3  =  殄
  -  ほ/方 + 龸 + う/宀/#3  =  殍
  -  ほ/方 + 宿 + ま/石  =  殕
  -  ほ/方 + を/貝 + れ/口  =  殞
  -  ほ/方 + 宿 + 数  =  殤
  -  ほ/方 + る/忄 + selector 1  =  殪
  -  ほ/方 + れ/口 + れ/口  =  殫
  -  ほ/方 + う/宀/#3 + を/貝  =  殯

Compounds of 少

  -  氷/氵 + ほ/方  =  沙
  -  ふ/女 + 氷/氵 + ほ/方  =  娑
  -  心 + 氷/氵 + ほ/方  =  莎
  -  ね/示 + 氷/氵 + ほ/方  =  裟
  -  せ/食 + 氷/氵 + ほ/方  =  鯊
  -  ほ/方 + せ/食  =  毟
  -  ほ/方 + い/糹/#2  =  雀
  -  も/門 + ほ/方 + そ/馬  =  尠
  -  き/木 + ほ/方 + そ/馬  =  杪
  -  め/目 + ほ/方 + そ/馬  =  眇
  -  に/氵 + ほ/方 + そ/馬  =  渺
  -  ゐ/幺 + ほ/方 + そ/馬  =  緲
  -  か/金 + ほ/方 + そ/馬  =  鈔
  -  の/禾 + ほ/方 + そ/馬  =  穆
  -  い/糹/#2 + ほ/方 + そ/馬  =  紗

Other compounds

  -  囗 + ほ/方  =  囮
  -  け/犬 + ほ/方  =  奉
  -  き/木 + ほ/方  =  棒
  -  な/亻 + け/犬 + ほ/方  =  俸
  -  て/扌 + け/犬 + ほ/方  =  捧
  -  日 + ほ/方  =  曙
  -  や/疒 + ほ/方  =  峰
  -  か/金 + ほ/方  =  鋒
  -  ほ/方 + む/車  =  蜂
  -  ひ/辶 + ほ/方  =  逢
  -  心 + ほ/方  =  蓬
  -  ゐ/幺 + ほ/方  =  縫
  -  ち/竹 + ひ/辶 + ほ/方  =  篷
  -  み/耳 + ほ/方  =  聾
  -  を/貝 + ほ/方  =  贅
  -  ほ/方 + 日  =  屠
  -  や/疒 + 宿 + ほ/方  =  峯
  -  火 + 宿 + ほ/方  =  烽
  -  む/車 + け/犬 + ほ/方  =  蚌

Notes

Braille patterns